Futuridium EP Deluxe is an indie shoot'em up video game developed by Italian developer MixedBag for the PlayStation 4, PlayStation Vita, Microsoft Windows, OS X and Linux. It was released in North America on September 30, 2014 and on October 1, 2014 in Europe.

The design of the game was influenced by the Commodore 64 title Uridium and the Star Fox series.

Reception

Futuridium EP Deluxe was received mixed to positive reviews upon release. The PlayStation Vita version holds a 75% rating on review aggregator GameRankings, while the PlayStation 4 version has a 70% rating. On Metacritic, the PlayStation 4 and Vita versions hold scores of 74/100 and 65/100 respectively. IGN gave both versions an 8/10.

Release
On March 3, 2016, it was announced that Futuridium EP Deluxe would be releasing on both the New Nintendo 3DS and Wii U platforms within the year. On March 4, 2016, developer MixedBag revealed that Futuridium EP Deluxe would receive a limited physical release of just 4,000 copies through Limited Run Games between both the PlayStation 4 and PlayStation Vita.

References

External links
 Press kit

2014 video games
Indie video games
iOS games
Linux games
MacOS games
New Nintendo 3DS games
Nintendo 3DS eShop games
Playism games
PlayStation 4 games
PlayStation Network games
PlayStation Vita games
Shooter video games
Single-player video games
Video games developed in Italy
Wii U eShop games
Windows games